Amici come noi is a 2014 Italian comedy film directed by Enrico Lando.

Cast

Production
The film was shot primarily in Monte Sant'Angelo. Other cities in which it was shot are Foggia, Milan, Rome and Amsterdam.

References

External links
Film

2014 films
Films about writers
Films directed by Enrico Lando
Italian comedy films
2010s Italian-language films
2014 comedy films
2010s Italian films